Stéphane Houdet and Shingo Kunieda defeated the defending champion Maikel Scheffers and his partner Gordon Reid in the final, 6–2, 2–6, 7–6 to win the men's doubles wheelchair tennis title at the 2014 US Open. With the win, Houdet became the first men's doubles wheelchair player to complete the Grand Slam.

Michaël Jérémiasz and Scheffers were the defending champions, but did not participate together. Jérémiasz partnered Nicolas Peifer, but was defeated by Scheffers and Reid in the semifinals.

Seeds
 Stéphane Houdet /  Shingo Kunieda (champions)
 Gordon Reid /  Maikel Scheffers (final)

Doubles

Bracket

References

Draw

Wheelchair Men's Doubles
U.S. Open, 2014 Men's Doubles